Jorge Rivera Soriano (born September 2, 1964) is a Mexican luchador (Spanish for "professional wrestler") who is best known as a trainer. He has been a tecnico throughout his wrestling career. He is currently training wrestlers at Arena Xalapa, different states of Mexico and the United States.

Professional wrestling career

Rivera started wrestling in 1987 under the names of "Porsche" and "El Seminarista". As El Seminarista, he won a Luchas de Apuestas (bet match) against a young Super Crazy for his mask. He later wrestled as "La Flecha" between 1988 and 1993. His breakout year was when he went to Asistencia Asesoría y Administración in 1995 with the new gimmick of "Power Raider Blanco" (Spanish for "Power Ranger White") and became a member of the Power Raider group. The whole idea of this was Antonio Peña's who thought doing this could get the fans excited. Peña later got sued by Mattel and decided to re-gimmick all of those who were in Power Raider to Los Cadetes Del Espacio. Since then he changed his name to "Boomerang" for a year before changing it to his most famous one, "Skayde". He later left AAA in 1997 to work for Promo Azteca. In Promo Azteca, he wrestled as Skayde before leaving in 1998. In 1999 he worked between Asistencia Asesoría y Administración, Consejo Mundial de Lucha Libre, and International Wrestling Revolution Group as "Electra". In 2000, Rivera started to wrestle in Toryumon Mexico using his real name and unmasking as "Jorge Rivera". Rivera then traveled to the United States, where he wrestled in both Chikara and Combat Zone Wrestling as Destello. Rivera has also wrestled in Japan in Dragon Gate as Skayde. and is currently wrestling on the independent circuit in Mexico. In March 2009, Rivera took part in the Chikara's King of Trios Tournament, teaming up with Mike Quackenbush and Johnny Saint in "The Masters of a Thousand Holds" team. They would win their opening round match against "Incoherence" (Delirious, Hallowicked and Frightmare), but would lose their quarter-final round match against "Team Uppercut", which consisted of Bryan Danielson, Claudio Castagnoli, and Dave Taylor. Rivera was scheduled to enter the 2010 King of Trios tournament, teaming with El Valiente and Turbo, but after he reportedly tried to hold the company up for more money, while failing to deliver Valiente and Turbo, Chikara announced that they were severing ties with him effective immediately. In late 2012 Skayde started working with River City Wrestling (RCW) out of San Antonio, TX, both wrestling and running training clinics on teaching the local San Antonio wrestlers lucha libre. In 2017 Skayde joined the training team at the Pro Wrestling Revolution Training Academy in San Jose, CA.

Professional wrestling trainer
Over the years Skayde has had a hand in training the following wrestlers:

Championships and accomplishments
NWA Mexico
NWA Mexican Lightweight Championship (1 time)
NWA Mexican Welterweight Championship (3 times)
Pro Wrestling Illustrated
PWI ranked him #189 of the 500 best singles wrestlers of the PWI 500 in 2005
Universal Wrestling Association
UWA World Lightweight Championship (1 time)
Xtreme Mexican Wrestling
 XMW Junior Heavyweight Championship (1 time, current)
XMW Tag Team Championship (1 time) – with Durango Kid

Luchas de Apuestas record

References

External links
 
 Cagematch profile

1964 births
Living people
Mexican male professional wrestlers
Professional wrestling trainers
Masked wrestlers
Professional wrestlers from Mexico City
20th-century professional wrestlers
21st-century professional wrestlers
UWA World Lightweight Champions